Rural Valley is a borough in Armstrong County, Pennsylvania, United States. The population was 876 at the 2010 census.

Geography
Rural Valley is located in eastern Armstrong County at  (40.798714, -79.315932). Pennsylvania Route 85 passes through the borough, leading west  to Kittanning and east  to U.S. Route 119 at Home.

Streams
Cowanshannock Creek flows west through Rural Valley, leading to the Allegheny River.

Demographics

As of the census of 2000, there were 922 people, 382 households, and 267 families residing in the borough. The population density was 438.3 people per square mile (169.5/km2). There were 414 housing units at an average density of 196.8 per square mile (76.1/km2). The racial makeup of the borough was 98.26% White, 0.54% African American, 0.22% Native American, and 0.98% from two or more races. Hispanic or Latino of any race were 0.11% of the population.

There were 382 households, out of which 24.9% had children under the age of 18 living with them, 55.0% were married couples living together, 11.8% had a female householder with no husband present, and 30.1% were non-families. 26.7% of all households were made up of individuals, and 14.9% had someone living alone who was 65 years of age or older. The average household size was 2.33 and the average family size was 2.80.

The borough median age of 42 years was more than the county median age of 40 years. The distribution by age group was 20.1% under the age of 18, 8.7% from 18 to 24, 25.4% from 25 to 44, 24.7% from 45 to 64, and 21.1% who were 65 years of age or older. The median age was 42 years. For every 100 females there were 97.9 males. For every 100 females age 18 and over, there were 89.5 males.

The median income for a household in the borough was $26,250, and the median income for a family was $34,327. Males had a median income of $27,946 versus $20,000 for females. The per capita income for the borough was $14,238. About 13.0% of families and 17.4% of the population were below the poverty line, including 23.2% of those under age 18 and 15.4% of those age 65 or over.

Cemetery
Rural Valley Cemetery

See also
West Shamokin High School

References

Populated places established in 1836
Boroughs in Armstrong County, Pennsylvania
1836 establishments in Pennsylvania